Attukal is a Hindu pilgrimage centre located on the banks of Killi river, in the capital city of Thiruvananthapuram, Kerala, India. It is situated about two kilometres to the south east from Sree Padmanabhaswamy Temple.

The Attukal Bhagavathy Temple, one of the ancient temples of South India, is popularly described as Sabarimala of the Women, as women form the major portion of devotees. The Goddess in the temple of Attukal is worshipped as the Supreme Mother, creator of all living beings and the mighty preserver as well as destroyer of them all. The pilgrims from all over the country, who visit Sree Padmanabha Swamy Temple and worship the Lord, do not consider their visits complete without a visit to the shrine of the supreme Mother Attukalamma.

History 
According to mythology, Attukal Bhagavathy is supposed to be the divinised form of Kannaki, the famous heroine of Chilappathikaaram, written by Ilanko Adikal, the Tamil Poet. The story goes that after the destruction of ancient city of Madurai, Kannaki left the city and reached Kerala via Kanyakumari and on the way to Kodungalloor took a sojourn at Attukal. Kannaki is supposed to be the incarnation of Parvathy, the consort of Paramasiva. The all powerful and benign Attukal Bhagavathy reigns eternally supreme at Attukal and nurses devotees as a mother does her children. Thousands of devotees from far and near flock to the Temple to bend before the Goddess with awe and reverence to prostrate and redress their affliction and agony.

Events
The Pongala Mahotsavam is the most important festival of Attukal Bhagavathy Temple. This festival at Attukal has been entered into the Guinness book of world records as the largest congregation of women in the world. The offering of Pongala is a special temple practice prevalent in the southern part of Kerala and some parts of Tamil Nadu. It is a ten-day programme commencing on the Karthika star of the Malayalam month of Makaram-Kumbham (February–March) and closing with the sacrificial offering known as Kuruthitharpanam at night. On the ninth day, ie on the Pooram Star of the Makaram-Kumbham in the Malayalam month, the world-famous Attukal Pongala Mahotsavam takes place. The major part of the city itself at about 8 kilometre radius around the temple premises, where people of all caste, creed and religion, gather in open fields, roads, commercial institutions, premises of Government offices etc. emerges as a consecrated ground for observing Pongala rituals for more than 2.5 million women devotees assembling from different parts of Kerala and outside. The ceremony is mostly confined to women folk even though men can also observe the rituals. On the same day evening, there will be a procession from the temple to Manacaud Sree Dharma Sastha Temple accompanied by Kuthiyottam boys, and various artists performing different kinds of folk art forms which makes the procession so colorful. The enormous crowd which gathers in Thiruvananthapuram on this auspicious day is reminiscent of the Kumbhamela Festival of North India.

See also
 Attukal Temple
 Attukal Pongala
 Sree Padmanabhaswamy Temple

References 

Hindu pilgrimage sites in India
Suburbs of Thiruvananthapuram
Culture of Thiruvananthapuram